William Cathcart may refer to:

 William Cathcart, 1st Earl Cathcart (1755–1843), Scottish soldier and diplomat
 William Cathcart (Royal Navy officer) (1782–1804), officer in the Royal Navy during the French Revolutionary and Napoleonic Wars

See also
Cathcart (surname)